Allomallodon is a genus of beetles in the family Cerambycidae, containing the following species:

 Allomallodon bolivianus Wappes & Santos-Silva 2019
 Allomallodon hermaphroditus (Thomson, 1867)
 Allomallodon popelairei (Lameere, 1902)

References

Prioninae